Ucí is a town in the Motul Municipality, Yucatán in Mexico. As of 2010, the town has a population of 5,191.

References

Populated places in Yucatán